The 2010 Oregon gubernatorial election was held on Tuesday,  to elect the Governor of Oregon to a four-year term beginning on . The incumbent governor, Democrat Ted Kulongoski, was ineligible to run due to term limits barring him from being elected to more than two consecutive terms.

The Democratic candidate John Kitzhaber, who had previously served two terms as governor from 1995 to 2003, was elected to a third term, earning a narrow victory over Republican candidate Chris Dudley and two minor party candidates. Kitzhaber's election marked the first time in Oregon's history that a person has been elected to a third term as governor.

Oregon first used its new cross-nomination system, a form of fusion voting, in the 2010 general elections. In this system, a candidate for partisan public office can be nominated by up to three political parties.
Kitzhaber was nominated by the Independent Party of Oregon in addition to the Democratic Party.

Almost every opinion poll throughout the election season showed a statistical tie between the two, state Republicans saw this election as the best chance to win the governorship since the last Republican governor, Victor Atiyeh, was re-elected in 1982. Once polls closed on election day, Dudley had led in early vote counts, but Kitzhaber narrowly won due to wide margins in Multnomah and Lane counties. However, this remains the closest Republicans have come to winning the governorship since that election.

Democratic primary

Candidates
John Kitzhaber, former Governor of Oregon
Bill Bradbury, former Oregon Secretary of State
Roger Obrist

Polling

Results

Republican primary

Candidates
Chris Dudley, former professional basketball player
Allen Alley, businessman and deputy chief of staff to Governor Ted Kulongoski
 Clark Colvin, business executive
 William Ames Curtright
 Bob Forthan
 Darren Karr, small business owner
 John Lim, former Oregon State Senator and unsuccessful nominee for the U.S. Senate in 1998
 Bill Sizemore, 1998 Republican nominee for Governor of Oregon
 Rex O. Watkins, real estate agent

Polling

Results

Independent Party primary
Oregon first used its new cross nomination system, a form of fusion voting, in the 2010 general elections. In this system, a candidate for partisan public office can be nominated by up to three political parties.
As a result, the Independent Party of Oregon did not file a candidate and instead chose to hold a month-long online primary in July. In doing so, it became the first political party in the United States to conduct a binding statewide primary election entirely over the Internet,
and it was the largest nominating process ever held by an Oregon minor political party.
Republican Chris Dudley did not apply for the Independent Party nomination by the required date, so he was not on the ballot, but he could be written in.

Candidates
 John Kitzhaber, former Governor of Oregon
 Jerry Wilson, businessman
 Richard Esterman, photographer

Results

General election

Candidates
 Chris Dudley (Republican), former professional basketball player
 John Kitzhaber (Democratic, Independent Party of Oregon), former Governor of Oregon
 Greg Kord (Constitution), industrial piping designer
 Wes Wagner (Libertarian), systems administrator

Campaign
Following the primaries, the two leading candidates, Dudley and Kitzhaber, campaigned separately throughout the state for the summer. Despite attempts by both campaigns to arrange a debate, the candidates could only agree on a single debate on September 30. Through the end of September, the Dudley campaign had raised $5.6 million, more than twice as much as the Kitzhaber campaign.

Throughout the last few months of the campaign, opinion polls showed a tight race with the lead apparently changing frequently.

Newspaper endorsements

Predictions

Polling

Results

Statewide results

County results
Dudley won 29 of Oregon's 36 counties. Kitzhaber won seven, including Multnomah County by a 43% margin of victory.

See also
 2010 Oregon state elections
 2010 United States gubernatorial elections
 Governor of Oregon
 List of governors of Oregon

References

External links
Oregon Governor Candidates at Project Vote Smart
Campaign contributions for 2010 Oregon Governor from Follow the Money
Oregon Governor 2010 from OurCampaigns.com

Election 2010: Oregon Governor from Rasmussen Reports
2010 Oregon Governor Race from Real Clear Politics
2010 Oregon Governor's Race from CQ Politics
Race Profile in The New York Times
Official campaign websites (Archived)
John Kitzhaber for Governor (D)
Chris Dudley for Governor (R)

Gubernatorial
2010
2010 United States gubernatorial elections